Burunovka (Boron) is a rural locality (a selo) and the administrative centre of Burunovsky Selsoviet, Gafuriysky District, Bashkortostan, Russia. The population was 258 as of 2010. There are 2 streets.

Geography 
Burunovka is located 33 km southwest of Krasnousolsky (the district's administrative centre) by road. Petropavlovka is the nearest rural locality.

References 

Rural localities in Gafuriysky District